This is a list of reigning non-sovereign monarchs, including traditional rulers and governing constitutional monarchs, but not the kings of Lesotho, Morocco and Eswatini. Each monarch listed below reigns over a legally recognised dominion, but in most cases possess little or no sovereign governing power. Their titles, however, are recognised by the state. Entries are listed beside their respective dominions, and are grouped by country.

List of constituent African monarchs

Country notes

Cameroon 
Cameroon's traditional authorities are split into first, second, and third degree chiefdoms. First degree chiefdoms contain at least two second degree chiefdoms, while second degree chiefdoms contain at least two third degree chiefdoms. Third degree chiefdoms generally contain only a village, small rural area or a small part of an urban centre. Some leaders are from ancient, pre-colonial lineages, while others are appointed by political leaders. The extent of authority between traditional authorities varies.

There are around 79 first degree chiefdoms, 875 second degree chiefdoms, and 12,582 third degree chiefdoms.

Ghana 
The Constitution of the Republic of Ghana establishes the rule of traditional leaders, as well as a National House of Chiefs. All traditional leaders are registered with the National House of Chiefs as well as with the eleven Regional Houses of Chiefs, in accordance with the Chieftaincy (Membership of Regional Houses of Chiefs) Instrument, as published in the Gazette.

Nigeria 
For a full list of the extant Nigerian traditional states and their rulers, see List of Nigerian traditional states.

Although Nigeria's traditional monarchs are legally recognized (by way of the numerous Chiefs' Laws), they don't currently have a constitutional role in the country.

South Africa 
In 2004, the Mbeki administration established the Commission on Traditional Leadership Disputes and Claims (CTLDC) to determine the legitimacy of the nation's traditional kingships. The purpose of the commission was to reconstruct the institutions of indigenous leadership after their distortion under the colonial and apartheid regimes.

In July 2010, acting on the findings of the commission, the Zuma administration announced that the government would cease recognising a total of six of the thirteen traditional kingships upon the deaths of their incumbent monarchs. Their successors would be recognised as "principal traditional leaders", a status yet to be defined. The commission was denounced by several senior traditional leaders, who have taken the government to court in an attempt to reverse the ruling.

Notes

Africa

Benin

Botswana

Namibia

South Africa

Uganda

See also
 African royalty (category)
 List of current constituent Asian monarchs

References

Further reading

Monarchs